Company Flow was an American hip hop trio from Brooklyn, New York City, consisting of Bigg Jus, El-P and Mr. Len.

The group was at one time associated with the independent record label Rawkus Records. Rapper/producer El-P and DJ/producer Mr. Len founded the group in 1992 in Queens, New York where rapper/producer Bigg Jus later joined.

History
Founding members El-P and Mr. Len met when the latter was hired to perform as a DJ at the former's 18th birthday party. The two quickly became friends and formed Company Flow in 1993. They released their first single, "Juvenile Techniques" later the same year. After El-P was introduced to Bigg Jus by underground rapper and indie label owner ANTTEX, the trio then released their debut EP, Funcrusher, on their own label Official Recordings in 1995.  A follow-up single, "8 Steps to Perfection" was put out in 1996. Subject to a major label bidding war on Libra Records, Company Flow waited until they could get a contract on their own terms. They eventually signed to Rawkus, and helped revitalize underground rap with labelmates like Mos Def. Their full-length debut album Funcrusher Plus was released in 1997 on Rawkus. After two years of pushing the album and touring, group member Bigg Jus decided to strike out on his own and the group amicably dissolved. El-P and Mr. Len followed up their debut with the instrumental album Little Johnny from the Hospitul: Breaks & Instrumentals Vol.1 (Rawkus).

By 2000, the relationship with Rawkus had disintegrated. The label was accused of neglecting the group's talent and being financially dishonest. The staff was fired shortly before Christmas, and Company Flow announced their departure from Rawkus shortly thereafter. Separately, El-P and Mr. Len ended their own deals with Rawkus, effectively severing the relationship between the three and Rawkus. El-P started his own record label (Definitive Jux) and pursued a solo career before eventually forming Run the Jewels with Killer Mike. Mr. Len has done the same with his (Dummy Smacks Records). Bigg Jus has released work on Big Dada and Mush Records.

Bigg Jus stated in 2006 that he was working on material for a new Company Flow album, suggesting the possibility of the group re-forming. Company Flow reunited for a show on October 19, 2007 in Brooklyn, New York City as well as a show on July 16, 2011, and supported Portishead at the inaugural British 'I'll Be Your Mirror' festival on July 23, 2011.

Company Flow performed their final show as a group at Coachella in 2012.

Discography

Albums and EPs

Singles
"Juvenile Techniques" (1994)
"8 Steps to Perfection" (1996)
"Infokill" (1996)
"Blind" (1997)
"End to End Burners...Episode 1" (1998)
"End to End Burners...Episode 2" (1998)
"Patriotism" from Soundbombing 2 (1999)
"D.P.A. (As Seen on TV)" (2000)

Guest appearances
 (Compilation - Rawkus Records) - "Lune TNS" from Soundbombing (1997)
 Boulevard Connection - "Jonny Rookie Card" from Sut Min Pik (1998)
 7 Notas 7 Colores - "NYC-BCN" from 77 (1999)
 Mike Ladd - "Bladerunners" from Welcome to the Afterfuture (1999)
 The Infesticons - "Night Time Theme" from Gun Hill Road (2000)
 DJ Krush - "Vision of Art" from Zen (2001)

Compilation appearances
 "Low Key" on Tags of the Times 3 (2001)

References

External links
 

1992 establishments in New York City
Alternative hip hop groups
Definitive Jux artists
Hip hop groups from New York City
American musical trios
Underground hip hop groups